Rhodobryum is a genus of mosses belonging to the family Bryaceae.

The genus has cosmopolitan distribution.

Species:

Rhodobryum abruptinervium (Müll. Hal.) Paris
Rhodobryum altopenduculatum (Müll. Hal.) Paris
Rhodobryum altoroseum (Müll. Hal. ex Broth.) Paris
Rhodobryum amblyacis (Müll. Hal.) Paris
Rhodobryum andicola (Hook.) Paris
Rhodobryum andinoroseum (Müll. Hal.) Paris
Rhodobryum angeiothecium (Müll. Hal.) Paris
Rhodobryum aubertii (Schwägr.) Thér.
Rhodobryum beyrichianum (Hornsch.) Müll. Hal.
Rhodobryum brunneidens (Müll. Hal.) Paris
Rhodobryum caulifolium (Müll. Hal.) Paris
Rhodobryum chalarorhodon (Müll. Hal. ex Broth.) Paris
Rhodobryum chilense Thér.
Rhodobryum chlororhodon (Müll. Hal.) Paris
Rhodobryum coloratum (Müll. Hal.) Paris
Rhodobryum comatum (Besch.) Paris
Rhodobryum commersonii (Schwägr.) Paris
Rhodobryum confluens Paris
Rhodobryum cygnopelma (Müll. Hal.) Paris
Rhodobryum dilatato-marginatum (Müll. Hal.) Paris
Rhodobryum dobsonianum (Müll. Hal.) Paris
Rhodobryum domingense (Brid.) Besch.
Rhodobryum ehrenbergianum (Müll. Hal.) Paris
Rhodobryum ellipticifolium (Brizi) Paris
Rhodobryum erythrocaulon (Schwägr.) Paris
Rhodobryum erythropyxis (Müll. Hal.) Paris
Rhodobryum flavifolium (Müll. Hal.) Paris
Rhodobryum fluminale (Müll. Hal. ex Broth.) Paris
Rhodobryum giganteum (Schwägr.) Paris
Rhodobryum globicoma (Müll. Hal.) Paris
Rhodobryum graeffeanum (Müll. Hal.) Paris
Rhodobryum grandifolium (Taylor) Schimp.
Rhodobryum hieronymi (Müll. Hal.) Paris
Rhodobryum homalobolax (Müll. Hal. ex Renauld) Paris
Rhodobryum horizontale Hampe
Rhodobryum huillense (Welw. & Duby) A. Touw
Rhodobryum humipetens (Müll. Hal.) Paris
Rhodobryum ischyrorhodon (Müll. Hal.) Paris
Rhodobryum jungneri (Broth.) Paris
Rhodobryum keniae (Müll. Hal.) Broth.
Rhodobryum lato-cuspidatum (Müll. Hal.) Paris
Rhodobryum laxelimbatum (Hampe ex Ochi) Z. Iwats. & T.J. Kop.
Rhodobryum le-ratii Paris & Broth.
Rhodobryum lechleri (Müll. Hal.) Paris
Rhodobryum leptorhodon (Müll. Hal.) Paris
Rhodobryum leptothecium (Taylor) Paris
Rhodobryum leucocanthum Hampe
Rhodobryum leucothecium (Müll. Hal.) Paris
Rhodobryum leucothrix (Müll. Hal.) Broth.
Rhodobryum liebmannii (Schimp.) Paris
Rhodobryum limbato-marginatum (Müll. Hal.) Paris
Rhodobryum lindigianum (Hampe) Paris
Rhodobryum longicaudatum M. Zang & X.J. Li
Rhodobryum lorentzianum (Müll. Hal.) Paris
Rhodobryum luehmannianum (Müll. Hal.) Paris
Rhodobryum medianum (Mitt.) Paris
Rhodobryum megalostegium (Sull.) Paris
Rhodobryum microcomosum (Müll. Hal.) Paris
Rhodobryum minutirosatum (Müll. Hal.) Paris
Rhodobryum nanorosula (Müll. Hal.) Paris
Rhodobryum nanorrhodon (Müll. Hal. ex Besch.) Paris
Rhodobryum neelgheriense (Mont.) Paris
Rhodobryum ontariense (Kindb.) Paris
Rhodobryum pallenticoma (Müll. Hal.) Paris
Rhodobryum perspinidens (Broth.) Pócs
Rhodobryum platense (Müll. Hal.) Paris
Rhodobryum pohliaeopsis (Müll. Hal.) Paris
Rhodobryum preussii (Broth.) Paris
Rhodobryum procerum (Schimp.) Paris
Rhodobryum pseudomarginatum (Geh. & Hampe) Paris
Rhodobryum ptychothecioides (Müll. Hal.) Paris
Rhodobryum quintasii (Broth.) Paris
Rhodobryum rhodocephalum (Müll. Hal.) Paris
Rhodobryum rigidum (Hornsch.) Paris
Rhodobryum robustulum (Müll. Hal.) Paris
Rhodobryum robustum (Hampe) Paris
Rhodobryum roseodens (Müll. Hal.) Paris
Rhodobryum roseolum (Müll. Hal.) Paris
Rhodobryum roseum (Hedw.) Limpr.
Rhodobryum rosulatulum (Müll. Hal.) Paris
Rhodobryum rosulatum (Müll. Hal.) Paris
Rhodobryum rosulicoma (Renauld & Cardot) Paris
Rhodobryum russulum (Broth. & Geh.) Paris
Rhodobryum saprophilum Paris
Rhodobryum sartorii (Schimp.) Paris
Rhodobryum spathulosifolium (Müll. Hal.) Paris
Rhodobryum staudtii (Broth.) Paris
Rhodobryum streptorhodon (Müll. Hal.) Paris
Rhodobryum subcrispatum (Müll. Hal.) Paris
Rhodobryum subolivaceum (Müll. Hal.) Paris
Rhodobryum subroseum (Besch.) Paris
Rhodobryum subverticillatum Broth.
Rhodobryum swartzianum (Müll. Hal.) Paris
Rhodobryum truncorum (Brid.) Paris
Rhodobryum umbraculum (Bruch ex Hook.) Schimp. ex Paris
Rhodobryum utriculosum (Müll. Hal.) Paris
Rhodobryum verticillatum Hampe

References

Bryaceae
Moss genera